Campbell County Courthouse may refer to:

Caroline County Courthouse (Maryland) 
Caroline County Courthouse (Virginia), listed on the NRHP in Virginia